Hummel Field  is a public use airport located six nautical miles (11 km) east of the central business district of Saluda, in Middlesex County, Virginia, United States. It is owned by the County Board of Supervisors.

Facilities and aircraft 
It has one runway designated 1/19 with an asphalt surface measuring 2,270 by 45 feet (692 x 14 m).

For the 12-month period ending October 30, 2008, the airport had 12,476 aircraft operations, an average of 34 per day: 98% general aviation and 2% military.
At that time there were 36 aircraft based at this airport: 35 single-engine and one helicopter.

References

External links 
 Airport  Visit the Official Page at Middlesex County VA website

 
 

Airports in Virginia
Buildings and structures in Middlesex County, Virginia
Transportation in Middlesex County, Virginia